Newfoundland is a railroad station in the Newfoundland section of Jefferson Township, New Jersey. It was built by the New Jersey Midland Railway in 1872 and later served passengers on the New York, Susquehanna and Western Railroad (NYS&W).

The critically acclaimed and award winning 2003 independent film The Station Agent  starring Peter Dinklage was set and filmed largely in Newfoundland (during August 2002) and features the iconic train station featured in the film is located in the Jefferson Township section of Newfoundland. The station interior has been renovated and is marketed as a multiple-use studio.

NJ Midland/NYSW stations
Existing original station buildings from the New Jersey Midland can be found at Bogota, Vreeland Avenue, Hawthorne, Wortendyke, Wyckoff and Butler, among other places.

See also
Whippany Railway Museum
NYSW (passenger 1939-1966) map
Operating Passenger Railroad Stations Thematic Resource (New Jersey)

References

External links 
Newfoundland Train Station

Railway stations in the United States opened in 1872
Railway stations closed in 1958
Former New York, Susquehanna and Western Railway stations
Former railway stations in New Jersey
Railway stations in Morris County, New Jersey
West Milford, New Jersey
1872 establishments in New Jersey
1958 disestablishments in New Jersey
Railway stations closed in 1944